Nick Mathison is a Northern Irish politician who is an Alliance Party Member of the Legislative Assembly (MLA).

He was elected as an MLA in the 2022 Northern Ireland Assembly election for Strangford.

Political career 
He was previously a councillor in Newtownards on Ards and North Down Borough Council

During his election campaign, he promised to promote animal welfare, including a ban on blood sports.

References

External links 

Living people
Alliance Party of Northern Ireland MLAs
Northern Ireland MLAs 2022–2027
Year of birth missing (living people)
People from Newtownards
Irish animal rights activists
Alliance Party of Northern Ireland councillors